Harry George Salsinger (April 10, 1885 – November 27, 1958) was an American sportswriter who served as sports editor of The Detroit News for 49 years.

Biography
Salsinger was born in Springfield, Ohio. In 1907, he started writing for The Cincinnati Post.

In 1909, Salsinger began working at The Detroit News as sports editor, a position he held until his death in 1958. He covered 50 World Series, two Olympic Games, and many other sports including football, golf, tennis, and boxing. Salsinger was also a president of both the Baseball Writers' Association of America (BBWAA), and the Football Writers Association of America. Salsinger retired in January 1958 and died 10 months later at Henry Ford Hospital following a long illness.

Salsinger was married to Gladys E. Salsinger. They had a son, Harry G. Salsinger Jr., born in October 1919. 

In 1968, the BBWAA posthumously awarded Salsinger the J. G. Taylor Spink Award for his baseball writing. He was inducted into the Michigan Sports Hall of Fame in 2002.

Selected works
When 'Babe' Ruth Was Beaten by John McGraw, Baseball Magazine, November 1922 (reprinted in Literary Digest, December 2, 1922)
The day Johnny Bassler stole home, 1923 (reprinted in Baseball Digest, October 1955)
Cobb dominated baseball with his keen mind and a will to succeed, The Detroit News, November 2, 1924 (reprinted in "They Earned Their Stripes", pp. 33–37)
Lustrous Lenglen (Suzanne Lenglen), The Dearborn Independent, February 5, 1927, p. 7
Chilled Drama: Streaks on Ice (speed skating), The Dearborn Independent, February 1927, p. 7
New Idols for the Gallery: The Slashing Game (ice hockey), The Dearborn Independent, February 26, 1927, p. 7
Courage and Endurance -- Matters of Stomach Not of Heart, The Dearborn Independent, March 5, 1927, p. 12
The Weiser Typhoon - Old Barney (Walter Johnson), The Dearborn Independent, April 9, 1927, p. 14
The Gate God Ruth (Babe Ruth), The Dearborn Independent, April 23, 1927, p. 7
He Made a Man's Game out of Tennis (Bill Tilden), The Dearborn Independent, May 29, 1927, p. 7
The Weiser Typhoon - Old Barney (Walter Johnson), The Dearborn Independent, April 9, 1927, p. 14
Playing for Community (on Hank Greenberg's decision to play on Rosh Hashanah), The Detroit News, September 11, 1934
Rogell gets it going with defense (Billy Rogell), The Detroit News, September 11, 1935 (reprinted in "They Earned Their Stripes", pp. 114–115)
Cochrane owned Detroit in 1935 (Mickey Cochrane), The Detroit News, August 7, 1938 (reprinted in "They Earned Their Stripes", pp. 116–117)
Mullin was a brainiac on the mound (George Mullin), The Detroit News, January 10, 1944 (reprinted in "They Earned Their Stripes", pp. 174–175)
Goslin brought attitude then a title (Goose Goslin), The Detroit News (reprinted in "They Earned Their Stripes", pp. 156–157)
 Trick Schedule Tunes Out Radio, Baseball Digest, July 1945
 Speed Doesn't Count at Night, Baseball Digest, May 1947
 It's Howt-a-man (Art Houtteman), Baseball Digest, February 1948
 Groth Good, But He Still Must Grow-eth (Johnny Groth), Baseball Digest, January 1949
 The All-Time Tigers, Baseball Digest, February 1949
 Mr. Consistency Enters the Hall (Charlie Gehringer, Baseball Digest, July 1949
 Speaking Up for Speaker (Tris Speaker, Baseball Digest, August 1949
 Synonymitis (1950 Epidemic), Baseball Digest, July 1950
 American League's All-Timers, Baseball Digest, August 1950
 Trout Was Always Loose (Dizzy Trout, Baseball Digest, November 1950
Heilmann was a magician at bat (Harry Heilmann), The Detroit News, July 10, 1951 (reprinted in "They Earned Their Stripes", pp. 112–113)
 Minor Whiz, Major Wheeze (Ox Eckhardt, Baseball Digest, July 1951
 Eight-Inning Winner (Hooks Dauss, Baseball Digest, August 1951
 Greatest Pitcher? Waddell! (Rube Waddell, Baseball Digest, September 1951
 It's a National League Year, Baseball Digest, September 1951
 Bobo and His Short Story (Bobo Newsom), Baseball Digest, October 1952
 Perfect Average System Unlikely, Baseball Digest, February 1953
 Diamond Odds Against Grid Stars, Baseball Digest, April 1953
 The Passing of a Symbol (Connie Mack), Baseball Digest, April 1956
Dugout Dictionary, Baseball Digest, January 1957
What a Scout Looks for in a Boy, Baseball Digest, June 1957

References

1880s births
1958 deaths
People from Springfield, Ohio
Sportswriters from Ohio
The Detroit News people
20th-century American journalists
American male journalists
BBWAA Career Excellence Award recipients